St. John the Evangelist Roman Catholic Church and School Building is a historic former Roman Catholic church and school building at 419 N. Main Street in Wilkes-Barre, Luzerne County, Pennsylvania within the Diocese of Scranton.

Description
It was built in 1929, and is a three-story, red brick and cut stone building. It has a three bay front and measures 63 feet, 6 inches, wide and 124 feet, 2 inches deep.  The school closed in 1971, and parish in 1994.  Between 2000 and 2003, the building was renovated into 24 one-bedroom apartments.

It was added to the National Register of Historic Places in 2003.

References

Roman Catholic churches completed in 1929
20th-century Roman Catholic church buildings in the United States
Churches on the National Register of Historic Places in Pennsylvania
Churches in Luzerne County, Pennsylvania
Buildings and structures in Wilkes-Barre, Pennsylvania
National Register of Historic Places in Luzerne County, Pennsylvania